Vaddadi is name of a village in Andhra Pradesh and Telangana. Vaddadi is also a surname. Notable people with the surname include:

 Vaddadi Papaiah (1921–1992), painter, cover artist, and illustrator
 Vaddadi Subbarayudu (1854–1938), Indian Telugu writer and translator

Surnames of Indian origin